James Newton (born 1953) is an American flautist.

James Newton may also refer to:

James Newton (New South Wales politician) (1850–1913)
James Newton (Tasmanian politician) (1864–1929)
James Todd Newton (born 1970), American television personality
James William Newton, claimed to have invented the foghorn technique by using loud and low notes
James Newton (footballer) (1898–?), English footballer
James O. Newton (1882–1938), American football and basketball coach
James P. Newton, African American photographer

See also
James Newton Howard (born 1951), American composer
Jim Newton, a main character in the TV series Fury, played by Peter Graves